Theodore Monroe McNair (February 24, 1858 – November 21, 1915) was a Presbyterian missionary and a college football and baseball player for the Princeton Tigers as a halfback and center fielder in the 19th century. He played at the halfback position. He was one of the stars of football's early years of collegiate play.

McNair sent a photograph of an early Princeton baseball team playing Yale for a history book on the school's athletics program. He visited Japan as a missionary. He joined  the faculty of Meiji Gakuin University.

He was Scots-Irish and his ancestor came to America in 1738.

References

American football halfbacks
Princeton Tigers football players
19th-century players of American football
1858 births
1915 deaths
Baseball pitchers
Baseball outfielders
Princeton Tigers baseball players
People from Tokyo
Presbyterian missionaries in Japan
American people of Scotch-Irish descent